District scolaire 11 (or School District 11) was a Canadian school district in New Brunswick until June 2012.

District 11 was a Francophone district operating 21 public schools (gr. K-12) in Northumberland, Kent and Westmorland counties.

As of June 2012, enrollment is approximately 6,100 students and 440 teachers.  District 05 is headquartered in Richibucto.  New Brunswick School District 11 is now part of Francophone Sud School District.

List of schools

High schools
 Assomption
 Clément-Cormier
 Louis-J.-Robichaud
 Mgr-Marcel-François-Richard

Combined elementary and middle schools
 Blanche-Bourgeois
 Calixte-F.-Savoie
 Camille-Vautour
 Donat-Robichaud
 Dr-Marguerite-Michaud
 Grande-Digue
 Marée Montante
 Mgr-François-Bourgeois
 Mont Carmel
 Notre-Dame
 Père-Edgar-T.-LeBlanc
 Saint-Paul
 Soleil Levant

Elementary schools
 W.-F.-Boisvert

Other schools
 Baie-Sainte-Anne
 Carrefour Beausoleil

External links
 http://www.district11.nbed.nb.ca

Former school districts in New Brunswick
Education in Northumberland County, New Brunswick
Education in Kent County, New Brunswick
Education in Westmorland County, New Brunswick